The Bank is a silent slapstick comedy. It was Charlie Chaplin's tenth film for Essanay Films.

Released in 1915, it is a slight departure from the tramp character, as Charlie Chaplin plays a janitor in a bank. Edna Purviance plays the secretary on whom Charlie has a crush and dreams that she has fallen in love with him. Filmed at the Majestic Studio in Los Angeles. There doesn't appear to be any evidence that this film was received any differently from the bulk of Chaplin's early work, but today this film is often considered one of his best efforts during his Essanay period.

Synopsis
Charlie, feeling very important, enters the bank where he works. He descends to the vault and works its combination with great panache and opens the door. Charlie hangs his coat inside the vault and brings out his mop and bucket, signifying he is the bank's janitor. He causes typical havoc with his mop and then with his broom. Charlie sweeps one room and the other janitor sweeps the adjacent room. Instead of cleaning, they just sweep the rubbish to and fro from room to room, so it becomes the other's task.

Charlie discovers a package containing a tie with a note attached to it, written by the bank's typist. It is addressed "To Charles with love from Edna." Charlie jumps to the wrong conclusion that Edna is in love with him, not realizing the package is intended for another Charles — the cashier. Charlie gets a bunch of flowers and places them lovingly on Edna's desk with a note "love from Charlie. When Edna is told by Charles the cashier that they are not from him but from Charlie the janitor, she coldly tosses them into the wastebasket. Charlie finds them there and is heartbroken. Charlie then has a dream in which he heroically thwarts a bank robbery, rescuing Edna in the process. He turns to kiss the now-adoring Edna — but then he wakes up. Charlie is kissing his mop — while Edna is kissing her cashier boyfriend.

Cast
 Charles Chaplin — Charlie, a Janitor
 Edna Purviance — Edna, a Secretary
 Carl Stockdale — Charles, a Cashier
 Charles Inslee — President of the bank
 Leo White — Clerk
 Billy Armstrong — Another Janitor
 Fred Goodwins — Bald Cashier/Bank Robber with Derby
 John Rand — Bank Robber and salesman
 Lloyd Bacon — Bank Robber
 Frank Coleman — Bank Robber
 Paddy McGuire  — Cashier in White Coat
 Wesley Ruggles — Bank Customer
 Carrie Clark Ward — Bank Customer
 Lawrence A. Bowes — Bond Salesman

External links

1915 films
Short films directed by Charlie Chaplin
American silent short films
American black-and-white films
American crime comedy films
Essanay Studios films
1915 short films
Articles containing video clips
Works about janitors
Films about bank robbery
American comedy short films
1910s crime comedy films
1915 comedy films
1915 crime films
1910s American films
Silent American comedy films
1910s English-language films
Silent crime comedy films